Gay White Caswell (born May 30, 1948) is a writer and former political figure in Saskatchewan, Canada. She represented Saskatoon Westmount from 1982 to 1986 in the Legislative Assembly of Saskatchewan as a Progressive Conservative.

She was born Gay White in Davidson, Saskatchewan, the daughter of Eric W. White and Ann Patricia Foster. In 1971, she married John R. Caswell. Caswell lived in Saskatoon. She was defeated by John Edward Brockelbank when she ran for reelection to the Saskatchewan assembly in 1986.

In September 2009, senior Saskatchewan Crown prosecutor Wayne Buckle was awarded damages of $50,000 for comments posed on Caswell's blog; Caswell was also ordered to remove all internet postings about Buckle. As of 2009, Caswell was living in Brabant Lake.

References

1948 births
Living people
Progressive Conservative Party of Saskatchewan MLAs
People from Davidson, Saskatchewan
Women MLAs in Saskatchewan